Fonblanque and de Fonblanque are Huguenot names. They may refer to nine members of a prominent English family, descending from Jean de Grenier de Fonblanque, a banker, naturalised as Jean de Grenier Fonblanque:

Albany Fonblanque (1793–1872), English historian;
Edward Barrington de Fonblanque (1821–1895), English historian;
Edward Barrington de Fonblanque (British Army officer) (1895–1981), British Army officer;
Florence Gertrude de Fonblanque (1864–1949), British suffragist;
John Anthony Fonblanque (1759–1837), politician;
John Samuel Martin Fonblanque (1787–1865), Commissioner of Bankruptcy;
Philip de Fonblanque (1885–1940), British Army officer;
Sir John Pennefather, 1st Baronet (1856–1933), full name John de Fonblanque Pennefather;
Thomas de Grenier de Fonblanque (1793–1861), diplomat and  Consul-General to Serbia.

References